Coffea is a genus of flowering plants in the family Rubiaceae. Coffea species are shrubs or small trees native to tropical and southern Africa and tropical Asia. The seeds of some species, called coffee beans, are used to flavor various beverages and products. The fruits, like the seeds, contain a large amount of caffeine, and have a distinct sweet taste.  

The plant ranks as one of the world's most valuable and widely traded commodity crops and is an important export product of several countries, including those in Central and South America, the Caribbean and Africa. The coffee trade relies heavily on two of the over 120 species,  Coffea arabica (commonly known simply as "Arabica"), which accounts for 60–80% of the world's coffee production, and Coffea canephora (known as "Robusta"), which accounts for about 20–40%.  Both coffee species are vulnerable to shifting growing zones caused by climate change, likely to result in a decline in production in some of the most important growing regions.

Cultivation and use 

There are over 120 species of Coffea, which is grown from seed. The two most popular are Coffea arabica (commonly known simply as "Arabica"), which accounts for 60–80% of the world's coffee production, and Coffea canephora (known as "Robusta"), which accounts for about 20–40%.  C. arabica is preferred for its sweeter taste, while C. canephora has a higher caffeine content. C. arabica has its origins in the highlands of Ethiopia and the Boma Plateau of Sudan, and was the result of a hybrid between C. canephora and C. eugenioides.

The trees produce edible red or purple fruits, which are described either as epigynous berries or as indehiscent drupes. The fruit is often referred to as a "coffee cherry," and it contains two seeds, called "coffee beans." Despite these terms, coffee is neither a true cherry (the fruit of certain species in the genus Prunus) nor a true bean (seeds from plants in the family Fabaceae).

In about 5–10% of any crop of coffee fruits, only a single bean is found. Called a peaberry, it is smaller and rounder than a normal coffee bean.

Most commonly cultivated coffee species grow best at high elevations, but do not tolerate freezing temperatures.

The tree of Coffea arabica will grow fruits after three to five years, producing for an average of 50 to 60 years, although up to 100 is possible. The white flowers are highly scented. The fruit takes about nine months to ripen.

Ecology 
The caffeine in coffee beans serves as a toxic substance protecting the seeds of the plant, a form of natural plant defense against herbivory. Caffeine simultaneously attracts pollinators, specifically honeybees, by creating an olfactory memory that signals bees to return to the plant's flowers. Not all Coffea species contain caffeine, and the earliest species had little or no caffeine content. Caffeine has evolved independently in multiple lineages of Coffea in Africa, perhaps in response to high pest predation in the humid environments of West-Central Africa. Caffeine has also evolved independently in the more distantly related genera Theobroma (cacao) and Camellia (tea). This suggests that caffeine production is an adaptive trait in coffee and plant evolution. The fruit and leaves also contain caffeine, and can be used to make coffee cherry tea and coffee-leaf tea. The fruit is also used in many brands of soft drink as well as pre-packaged teas.

Several insect pests affect coffee production, including the coffee borer beetle (Hypothenemus hampei) and the coffee leafminer (Leucoptera caffeina).

Coffee is used as a food plant by the larvae of some Lepidoptera (butterfly and moth) species, Dalcera abrasa, turnip moth and some members of the genus Endoclita, including E. damor and E. malabaricus.

Research 

New species of Coffea are still being identified in the 2000s.  In 2008 and 2009, researchers from the Royal Botanic Gardens, Kew named seven from the mountains of northern Madagascar, including C. ambongensis, C. boinensis, C. labatii, C. pterocarpa, C. bissetiae, and C. namorokensis.

In 2008, two new species were discovered in Cameroon. Coffea charrieriana, which is caffeine-free, and Coffea anthonyi. By crossing the new species with other known coffees, two new features might be introduced to cultivated coffee plants: beans without caffeine and self-pollination.

In 2011, Coffea absorbed the twenty species of the former genus Psilanthus due to the morphological and genetic similarities between the two genera. Historically, the two have been considered distinct genera due to differences in the length of the corolla tube and the anther arrangement: Coffea with a short corolla tube and exserted style and anthers; Psilanthus with a long corolla tube and included anthers. However, these characteristics were not present in all species of either respective genus, making the two genera overwhelmingly similar in both morphology and genetic sequence. This transfer expanded Coffea from 104 species to 124, and extended its native distribution to tropical Asia and Australasia.

In 2014, the coffee genome was published, with more than 25,000 genes identified. This revealed that coffee plants make caffeine using a different set of genes from those found in tea, cacao and other such plants.

In 2017, a robust and almost fully resolved phylogeny of the entire genus was published. In addition to resolving the relationships of Coffea species, this study's results suggest Africa or Asia as the likely ancestral origin of Coffea and point to several independent radiations across Africa, Asia, and the Western Indian Ocean Islands.

In 2020 a technique of DNA fingerprinting, or genetic authentication of plant material was proven effective for coffee. For the study, scientists used DNA extraction and SSR marker analysis. This technique or ones similar may allow for several improvements to coffee production such as improved information for farmers as to the susceptibility of their coffee plants to pests and disease, a professionalized coffee seed system, and transparency and traceability for buyers of green, un-roasted coffee.

Species 

 Coffea abbayesii J.-F.Leroy
 Coffea affinis De Wild.
 Coffea alleizettii Dubard
 Coffea ambanjensis J.-F.Leroy
 Coffea ambongenis J.-F.Leroy ex A.P.Davis
 Coffea andrambovatensis J.-F.Leroy
 Coffea ankaranensis J.-F.Leroy ex A.P.Davis
 Coffea anthonyi Stoff. & F.Anthony
 Coffea arabica L.
 Coffea arenesiana J.-F.Leroy
 Coffea augagneurii Dubard
 Coffea bakossii Cheek & Bridson
 Coffea benghalensis B.Heyne ex Schult.
 Coffea bertrandii A.Chev.
 Coffea betamponensis Portères & J.-F.Leroy
 Coffea bissetiae A.P.Davis & Rakotonas.
 Coffea boinensis A.P.Davis & Rakotonas.
 Coffea boiviniana A.P.Davis & Rakotonas.
 Coffea bonnieri Dubard
 Coffea brassii (J.-F.Leroy) A.P.Davis
 Coffea brevipes Hiern
 Coffea bridsoniae A.P.Davis & Mvungi
 Coffea buxifolia A.Chev.
 Coffea canephora ("Coffea robusta") Pierre ex A.Froehner
 Coffea carrissoi A.Chev.
 Coffea charrieriana Stoff. & F.Anthony
 Coffea cochinchinensis Pierre ex Pit.
 Coffea commersoniana (Baill.) A.Chev.
 Coffea congensis A.Froehner
 Coffea costatifructa Bridson
 Coffea coursiana J.-F.Leroy
 Coffea dactylifera Robbr. & Stoff.
 Coffea decaryana J.-F.Leroy
 Coffea dubardii Jum.
 Coffea ebracteolata (Hiern) Brenan
 Coffea eugenioides S.Moore
 Coffea fadenii Bridson
 Coffea farafanganensis J.-F.Leroy
 Coffea floresiana Boerl.
 Coffea fotsoana Stoff. & Sonké
 Coffea fragilis J.-F.Leroy
 Coffea fragrans Wall. ex Hook.f.
 Coffea gallienii Dubard
 Coffea grevei Drake ex A.Chev.
 Coffea heimii J.-F.Leroy
 Coffea homollei J.-F.Leroy
 Coffea horsfieldiana Miq.
 Coffea humbertii J.-F.Leroy
 Coffea humblotiana Baill.
 Coffea humilis A.Chev.
 Coffea jumellei J.-F.Leroy
 Coffea kapakata (A.Chev.) Bridson
 Coffea kianjavatensis J.-F.Leroy
 Coffea kihansiensis A.P.Davis & Mvungi
 Coffea kimbozensis Bridson
 Coffea kivuensis Lebrun
 Coffea labatii A.P.Davis & Rakotonas.
 Coffea lancifolia A.Chev.
 Coffea lebruniana Germ. & Kester
 Coffea leonimontana Stoff.
 Coffea leroyi A.P.Davis
 Coffea liaudii J.-F.Leroy ex A.P.Davis
 Coffea liberica Hiern
 Coffea ligustroides S.Moore
 Coffea littoralis A.P.Davis & Rakotonas.
 Coffea lulandoensis Bridson
 Coffea mabesae (Elmer) J.-F.Leroy
 Coffea macrocarpa A.Rich.
 Coffea madurensis Teijsm. & Binn. ex Koord.
 Coffea magnistipula Stoff. & Robbr.
 Coffea malabarica (Sivar., Biju & P.Mathew) A.P.Davis
 Coffea mangoroensis Portères
 Coffea mannii (Hook.f.) A.P.Davis
 Coffea manombensis A.P.Davis
 Coffea mapiana Sonké, Nguembou & A.P.Davis
 Coffea mauritiana Lam.
 Coffea mayombensis A.Chev.
 Coffea mcphersonii A.P.Davis & Rakotonas.
 Coffea melanocarpa Welw. ex Hiern
 Coffea merguensis Ridl.
 Coffea millotii J.-F.Leroy
 Coffea minutiflora A.P.Davis & Rakotonas.
 Coffea mogenetii Dubard
 Coffea mongensis Bridson
 Coffea montekupensis Stoff.
 Coffea montis-sacri A.P.Davis
 Coffea moratii J.-F.Leroy ex A.P.Davis & Rakotonas.
 Coffea mufindiensis Hutch. ex Bridson
 Coffea myrtifolia (A.Rich. ex DC.) J.-F.Leroy
 Coffea namorokensis A.P.Davis & Rakotonas.
 Coffea neobridsoniae A.P.Davis
 Coffea neoleroyi A.P.Davis
 Coffea perrieri Drake ex Jum. & H.Perrier
 Coffea pervilleana (Baill.) Drake
 Coffea pocsii Bridson
 Coffea pseudozanguebariae Bridson
 Coffea pterocarpa A.P.Davis & Rakotonas.
 Coffea racemosa Lour.
 Coffea rakotonasoloi A.P.Davis
 Coffea ratsimamangae J.-F.Leroy ex A.P.Davis & Rakotonas.
 Coffea resinosa (Hook.f.) Radlk.
 Coffea rhamnifolia (Chiov.) Bridson
 Coffea richardii J.-F.Leroy
 Coffea sahafaryensis J.-F.Leroy
 Coffea sakarahae J.-F.Leroy
 Coffea salvatrix Swynn. & Philipson
 Coffea sambavensis J.-F.Leroy ex A.P.Davis & Rakotonas.
 Coffea sapinii (De Wild.) A.P.Davis
 Coffea schliebenii Bridson
 Coffea semsei (Bridson) A.P.Davis
 Coffea sessiliflora Bridson
 Coffea stenophylla G.Don
 Coffea tetragona Jum. & H.Perrier
 Coffea togoensis A.Chev.
 Coffea toshii A.P.Davis & Rakotonas.
 Coffea travancorensis Wight & Arn.
 Coffea tricalysioides J.-F.Leroy
 Coffea tsirananae J.-F.Leroy
 Coffea vatovavyensis J.-F.Leroy
 Coffea vavateninensis J.-F.Leroy
 Coffea vianneyi J.-F.Leroy
 Coffea vohemarensis A.P.Davis & Rakotonas.
 Coffea wightiana Wall. ex Wight & Arn.
 Coffea zanguebariae Lour.

References

External links 

 World Checklist of Rubiaceae
 Coffee & Conservation

 
Fruits originating in Africa
Medicinal plants of Asia
Medicinal plants of Africa
Rubiaceae genera
Crops
Herbal and fungal stimulants